Hillcrest Country Club is a historically Jewish country club located on the west side of Los Angeles, California.

The club
Located in Los Angeles's Cheviot Hills neighborhood, Hillcrest opened in 1920 as the first  country club for the city's Jewish community. In 1972, the Los Angeles Times referred to Hillcrest as "the leading Jewish country club in Southern California." The property includes tennis courts, an Olympic-size swimming pool, and an 18-hole golf course, as well as a clubhouse with dining and meeting facilities for its members and their guests. The golf course, originally designed by Willie Watson, was redesigned and renovated by renowned architect Kyle Phillips in 2019.

In the 1950s oil was discovered on Hillcrest's land, and the club decided to permit drilling. Members who had shares in the club collect tax-sheltered dividends on their original initiation fees, and "B.O." (for "before oil") memberships became so valuable that they were willed from father to son.

Hillcrest was the site of the PGA Championship in 1929, one of golf's major tournaments. The championship was a match play competition and held in December 1929. It was won by defending champion Leo Diegel. It had the distinction of being the first major tournament held in the western United States. Hillcrest later hosted the Los Angeles Open on the PGA Tour in 1932 and 1942, won by Macdonald Smith and Ben Hogan, respectively.

From the back tees in 2013 the course rating was 73.1, with a slope rating of 136.

Rancho Park Golf Course, a nearby municipal course, has hosted the Los Angeles Open seventeen times and was the site of events on the Senior PGA Tour (1990–94) and LPGA Tour (1978–80).

Early years
Hillcrest was established in the early days of the movie industry in Hollywood, when Jews were not permitted to join non-Jewish country clubs. In An Empire of Their Own, Neal Gabler described charity dinners of the 1930s at the all-Jewish club, where movie moguls would gather and outbid one-another with gifts to the United Jewish Welfare Fund and other Jewish causes. In the 1940s Hillcrest attracted many of Hollywood's biggest stars, including Milton Berle, Jack Benny, Danny Kaye, the Marx Brothers, George Burns, George Jessel, Al Jolson, Eddie Cantor and the Ritz Brothers. According to various accounts, mogul Louis B. Mayer reportedly punched producer Sam Goldwyn in the nose while they were either in the showers or the steam room at Hillcrest.

In his 1995 book on the William Morris Agency, author Frank Rose described Hillcrest as being:
No sign, just a number on the stone entrance gates...Ever since the Depression, this had been the preserve of Hollywood's elite. All the great moguls had belonged to Hillcrest—Louis B. Mayer and the Warner brothers and Harry Cohn of Columbia and Adolph Zukor of Paramount.

Groucho makes an exception to his policy

Groucho Marx was a member of Hillcrest, even though he once famously proclaimed that he would not want to be a member of any club willing to have him as a member. (When one club offered to waive its no-Jews rule for Groucho, provided he abstained from using the swimming pool, he remarked, "My daughter's only half Jewish, can she wade in up to her knees?") Groucho once noted: "As you may recall, the Hillcrest is the only country club in all of Greater Los Angeles that will accept Talmudic scholars such as myself as members."

His ad-libbing and joking with the staff at Hillcrest became legendary. Alistair Cooke told of having lunch with Groucho at Hillcrest Country Club. There were many others sitting at the famed Hillcrest Comedians Round Table, and when the waiter came to take the dessert orders, he could not keep track of who was having what. "Two éclairs and four coffees—no, four éclairs and two coffees—no, wait a minute—..." Groucho interrupted, "Four eclairs and seven coffees ago, our forefathers brought forth on this continent a new na- ... oh, skip the rhetoric and bring the dessert!" After lunch, Groucho lined up to pay his bill behind a fat, fussy lady fiddling around in her bag for change. The impatient comedian instructed the young cashier: "Shoot her when you see the whites of her eyes!" The woman turned around and was thrilled that her abuser was none other than Groucho. "Oh!" she said. "Would you be Groucho Marx?" The quick-as-a-flash response: "What do you mean 'would I be Groucho Marx'? I am Groucho Marx! Who would you be if you weren't yourself? Marilyn Monroe no doubt. Well pay your bill, lady, you'll never make it."

Ultimately, Groucho considered his Hillcrest membership precious enough to pass on to his son in his will.

The Hillcrest "Round Table"
For years, many of Hollywood's top comedians, including Jack Benny, George Burns, George Jessel, Groucho Marx, Danny Kaye, and later Milton Berle and Don Rickles, got together for a regular Friday lunch at Hillcrest, where they would socialize, try new material out on their friends, and talk "shop." Alan King said the Friday lunches at Hillcrest were like a college for comedy. In 1972, the Los Angeles Times referred to the comedians' table at Hillcrest as the "Round Table" in a corner of the main dining room. Other members of the Round Table included Al Jolson, Harpo Marx, Eddie Cantor, Lou Holtz and Irving Brecher.

Comedian David Steinberg noted that Hillcrest “is a little like an inverted New York Athletic Club: there is no discrimination, but it sure helps if you’re Jewish and a comedian.” Milton Berle, a long-time member, described Hillcrest—known for its food—as “a dining club with golf."

In December 1963, Los Angeles Dodgers pitcher Sandy Koufax was roasted at Hillcrest by the Round Table comedians, along with guest roasters Frank Sinatra and Dean Martin. In what the Los Angeles Times called just about the only printable comment of the evening, George Jessel called Koufax, "without question, the most important Hebrew athlete since Samson."

Hillcrest was George Burns' home away from home, as he regularly held court there with his fellow comedians and friends. Unless he was out of town, he showed up every day from noon to 3 p.m. for his bridge game. At the time of his death in 1996, one of Burns' friends recalled: "The last time I saw George was two days before his death, when he arrived in a wheelchair for his bridge game."

When he died in 2002, Milton Berle had been a Hillcrest member for 70 years. In a 1994 interview with Cigar Aficionado, Berle recalled joining Hillcrest in 1932: "It cost me $275 to join in those days. Now the initiation fee is $150,000, if they'll accept you, which all depends on how much money you've given to the United Jewish Appeal."

Admission of non-Jews
When Hillcrest membership opened to non-Jews, their first choice for a new member was Danny Thomas, a Lebanese Catholic. At the time, Jack Benny quipped to Thomas that the least the club could have done was to admit a member who looked like a gentile. Other notable non-Jewish members over the years have included: Frank Sinatra, Los Angeles Dodgers owner Walter O'Malley, actor Jack Lemmon, Sidney Poitier, and Oscar-winning film producers Darryl F. Zanuck and Richard D. Zanuck.

References

External links

Leonardo Ciampa, "The Hillcrest Round Table: Remembering George Burns, Jack Benny, Al Jolson, Eddie Cantor, George Jessel, Milton Berle, the Marx Brothers, the Ritz Brothers, and Lou Holtz" 
Classic Photograph of the Hillcrest Round Table
Photograph of Danny Kaye in Hillcrest Locker Room

Organizations based in Los Angeles
Golf clubs and courses in Los Angeles
Jewish-American history
Jews and Judaism in Los Angeles